The Desert Hawk may refer to:

 The Desert Hawk (1924 film), American silent western film
 The Desert Hawk (serial), 1944 American film, part of Columbia film serial
 The Desert Hawk (1950 film), American film
 Dagar, the Desert Hawk, a fictional character in comic books published by Fox Feature Syndicate

See also
 Desert Hawk (disambiguation)